KXGR (89.7 MHz, "GRACEfm") is a non-profit FM radio station broadcasting a Christian radio format. Licensed to Loveland, Colorado, United States, it serves Northern Colorado including Fort Collins-Greeley and the Denver-Boulder metropolitan area.  Programming is simulcast on 101.7 KXCL in Rock Creek Park, Colorado, which serves Colorado Springs, and on 75 watt translator station 101.7 K299AO in Sterling, Colorado.  The stations are owned by Calvary Church with Ed Taylor.

KXGR and KXCL air a mix of Christian contemporary music and programs on Christian teaching from national and local religious leaders.

History
On March 11, 2004, the station received a construction permit to begin work from the Federal Communications Commission.  It had the call sign KXWA and was owned by the WAY-FM Media Group.  Way-FM is a chain of Contemporary Christian music stations.  The station signed on the following year.

In December 2010, the station was transferred to Calvary Church with Ed Taylor (formerly "Calvary Chapel Aurora") to start a different religious radio network.  The call letters changed to KXGR.

References

External links

Calvary Church with Ed Taylor

XGR
XGR
Loveland, Colorado
Radio stations established in 2004
Sterling, Colorado